Villabrázaro is a municipality located in the province of Zamora, Castile and León, Spain. According to the 2004 census (INE), the municipality has a population of 352.

Tourist attraction 

Near San Román del Valle is "Santuario de Nuestra Señora", so called "del Valle".

The first known reference is June 20, 970 and the current building was a Gothic convent in the 14th and 15th century. It is made of stone. The last mass was celebrated there August 27, 1961.

Iglesia de villabrazaro

Government

Local festivals 

 Bendito Cristo (May 31).
 La Magdalena (September 6).
 Fiesta del Convento (San Román del Valle, 2nd Sunday of May).
 Patrón de San Román del Valle (November 18).

References

External links
 http://www.ayuntamientodevillabrazaro.es . Villabrázaro town hall Web.
 http://villabrazaro.webcindario.com/ . Web about Villabrázaro by Nosfer.
 http://villabrazarolive.blogspot.com . Blog about Villabrázaro Vivo, by Ángela.
 Nortecastilla. Interesting information about Villabrázaro
 http://www.mispueblos.es/castilla_y_leon/zamora/villabrazaro/
 http://www.pueblos-espana.org/castilla+y+leon/zamora/villabrazaro/
 http://www.sanromandelvalle.com/
 http://sites.google.com/site/ciprirubio/san-roman-del-valle .Web about San Román del Valle by Cipri
 http://www.mispueblos.es/castilla_y_leon/zamora/san_roman_del_valle/
 http://www.todopueblos.com/zamora.net/san-roman-del-valle/

Municipalities of the Province of Zamora